Warren Smith (born February 20, 1990) is an American football quarterback for the Albany Empire of the National Arena League (NAL). He played college football at the University of Maine.

College career 
Smith continued his football career playing for Iona College, where he was named the team's starting quarterback as a freshman   in 2008. Following the 2008 season, Iona dropped football from its athletics programs, leaving the players the ability to transfer without sitting out a season. Smith decided to transfer to the University of Maine, where he won the starting quarterback position as a junior in 2010, leading the Black Bears to a 4–7 record. As a senior in 2011, he led the team to an 8–3 regular season record, helping the Black Bears qualify for the NCAA Championship Playoffs. The Black Bears won their first-round game, but lost in the second round to Georgia Southern. Smith was named Second Team All-Colonial Athletic Association following the season.

Professional career

Dresden Monarchs 
In 2012, Smith signed with the Dresden Monarchs of the German Football League. Smith was the Monarchs leading passer and second leading rusher on the season. The Monarchs finished third in the northern division of the GFL with a 10–4 record and qualified for the play-offs where they were knocked out by the Kiel Baltic Hurricanes in the semi finals.

Richmond Raiders 
In 2013, Smith signed with the Richmond Raiders of the Professional Indoor Football League (PIFL). Smith guided the Raiders to a 7–5 record during the regular season, tying the second best record in the PIFL. Smith and the Raiders won their playoff game against the Lehigh Valley Steelhawks, but would lose PIFL Cup II to the Alabama Hammers.

Trenton Freedom 
In 2014, Smith signed with the expansion Trenton Freedom, also of the PIFL. Smith's impressive 46 touchdowns passing and 13 more rushing, led to him being named the 2014 PIFL MVP.

Spokane Shock 
In October 2014, Smith was assigned to the Spokane Shock of the Arena Football League (AFL). Smith made his first career start for the Shock during their Week 7 game against the Los Angeles KISS. Smith completed 23 of 29 attempts with six touchdowns in a 68–46 victory. He finished the season with 1,816 passing yards, 32 passing touchdowns, 11 interceptions and five rushing touchdowns in eight starts at quarterback.

Philadelphia Yellow Jackets 
On October 15, 2015, Smith signed with the Philadelphia Yellow Jackets of American Indoor Football. On May 24, 2016, Smith was released.

Philadelphia Soul 
On October 16, 2015, Smith was assigned to the Philadelphia Soul. On February 5, 2016, Smith was reassigned by the Soul.

Lehigh Valley Steelhawks 
On May 24, 2016, Smith signed with the Lehigh Valley Steelhawks. He earned NAL MVP and First Team All-NAL honors in 2017 after playing in 10 games while completing 169 of 256 passes for 1,953 yards, 56 touchdowns and 8 interceptions. He re-signed with the Steelhawks in September 2017.

Tampa Bay Storm 
On July 19, 2016, Smith was assigned to the Tampa Bay Storm. He completed two of two pass attempts for 21 yards in the Storm's playoff loss to the Philadelphia Soul. He also rushed once for three yards.

Baltimore Brigade
Smith was the eighth, and final, player selected by the Baltimore Brigade in the January 2017 expansion draft. On July 13, 2017, the Brigade placed Smith on reassignment.

Washington Valor
On July 14, 2017, Smith was claimed off reassignment by the Washington Valor. He started the team's final game of the season, completing 21 of 35 passes for 229 yards, 5 touchdowns and 2 interceptions in a 41–35 win against the Baltimore Brigade. He also scored a rushing touchdown in the game. On March 21, 2018, he was assigned to the Valor. On May 22, 2018, he was placed on reassignment, but was reassigned to the Valor on May 24.

Atlantic City Blackjacks
On March 5, 2019, Smith was assigned to the Atlantic City Blackjacks.

Jersey Flight
On January 9, 2020, Smith signed with the Jersey Flight. The 2020 National Arena League season was canceled due to the COVID-19 pandemic.

AFL statistics

Stats from ArenaFan:

References

External links 
Iona Gaels bio 
Maine Black Bears bio 
Arena Football bio

Living people
1990 births
American football quarterbacks
Iona Gaels football players
Lacey Township High School alumni
Maine Black Bears football players
Richmond Raiders players
Trenton Freedom players
Spokane Shock players
Philadelphia Soul players
Players of American football from New Jersey
Sportspeople from Lacey Township, New Jersey
Philadelphia Yellow Jackets players
Lehigh Valley Steelhawks players
Tampa Bay Storm players
Baltimore Brigade players
Washington Valor players
Atlantic City Blackjacks players